Diversidoris crocea is a species of colourful sea slug, a dorid nudibranch, a shell-less marine gastropod mollusk in the family Chromodorididae.

Distribution 
This species is found in the tropical western Pacific, including: Indonesia, Philippines, Solomon Islands, Guam, and south to Queensland, Australia.

Description
It has a yellow body with a pale mantle margin that has two semi-permanent mantle folds about mid-body. The rhinophores and branchia (gills) are also yellow. However, identifying individual yellow sea slugs within the genus Diversidoris can be challenging because yellow forms which mimic their food, yellow sponges, exist in many related species.

Ecology
This species is often found on the yellow sponge Darwinella, which appears to be its preferred food source.

References

External links
 

Chromodorididae
Gastropods described in 1986